The year 1949 in television involved some significant events.
Below is a list of television-related events during 1949.


Events 
 January 3: Colgate Theatre premieres on NBC.
 January 11: A two-hour special on all American networks celebrates the linking of the eastern and midwestern networks via coaxial cable.
 January 21: Your Show Time becomes the first filmed dramatic series on American network television.
 January 31: The first Emmy Awards are presented and broadcast on television from Los Angeles.
 May: The first telethon, benefitting the Damon Runyon Cancer Fund, is hosted by Milton Berle and lasts for 24 hours.
 August 25: RCA announces the development of a compatible color TV system.
 December 17: The Sutton Coldfield television transmitter is opened in the English Midlands, making it the first part of the UK outside London to receive BBC Television.
 December 29: KC2XAK of Bridgeport, Connecticut becomes the first Ultra high frequency (UHF) television station to operate a daily schedule.
 First television broadcasts begin in Cuba.
 For the first time, the Sears & Roebuck catalog includes televisions.

Debuts

Programs 
 January 16: ABC Television Players, a dramatic anthology, debuts on ABC (1949).
 January 17: The Goldbergs, a situation comedy, debuts on CBS (1949–55).
 May 5: Series Stop the Music debuts on American Broadcasting Company for a five-year run over seven years.
 June 27: Captain Video and His Video Rangers, apparently the first science fiction series televised, debuts.
 July 15: This Is Show Business, panel discussion program, premieres on CBS (1949–54; 1956).
 September 28: Photocrime, detective program, premieres on ABC (1949).
 September 29: Come Dancing, a ballroom dancing competition, is first broadcast by the BBC (1949–95).
 Martin Kane, Private Eye premieres on NBC, becoming the first detective series televised (1949–54).
 The Voice of Firestone premieres (1949–63).
 Bozo the Clown premieres (1949–present).
 The Lone Ranger premieres on ABC (1949–57).

Stations 
 January 1: KPRC-TV (Originally known as KLEE-TV) Signs on the air. They are the Second TV station in Texas, and the First in Houston. That same day, KTTV Signs on in Los Angeles.
 March 21: WTVJ signs on the air becoming the first television station in the state of Florida.
 May 29: WVTM-TV (Originally WAFM, and later WABT and WAPI) Signs on the air as the first TV station in Alabama
 May 30: WRTV (originally WFBM-TV) Signs on the air as the first TV station in Indiana
 June 6: KFOR-TV (originally WKY-TV) Signs on the air as the first TV station in Oklahoma
 July 1 WBRC Begins operations from Birmingham AL, just 1 month after WVTM started operations.
 August 29: WOWT (originally WOW-TV) Signs on the air for the first time, becoming the first television station in Nebraska, and one of the first in the Midwest.

Television shows

Programs ending during 1949

Changes of network affiliation

Births 
January 7 – Steven Williams, actor, (21 Jump Street)
January 8 – Anne Schedeen, actress, (ALF)
January 13 – Brandon Tartikoff, executive (died 1997)
January 16 – Caroline Munro, English actress and model
January 17 – Andy Kaufman, actor and comedian (died 1984)
January 24 – John Belushi, actor and comedian, (Saturday Night Live) (died 1982)
February 2 – Brent Spiner, actor, (Star Trek: The Next Generation)
February 3 – Brenda Dickson, actress, (The Young and the Restless)
February 8 – Brooke Adams, actress
February 9 – Judith Light, actress, (One Life to Live, Who's The Boss?)
February 18 – Jess Walton, actress, (The Young and the Restless)
February 26 – Tim Brant, sportscaster
February 28 – Ilene Graff, actress and singer, (Mr. Belvedere)
March 2 – Gates McFadden, actress and choreographer, (Star Trek: The Next Generation)
March 16 
Erik Estrada, actor, (CHiPs)
Victor Garber, Canadian actor and singer, (Alias, Legends of Tomorrow)
March 17 – Patrick Duffy, actor, (Dallas, Step by Step)
March 26 
Vicki Lawrence, actress and comedian, (The Carol Burnett Show, Mama's Family)
Ernest Lee Thomas, actor, (What's Happening!!, What's Happening Now!!)
April 14 – John Shea, actor
April 17 – Michael J. Stull, songwriter (died 2002)
April 19 – Forrest Sawyer, American broadcast journalist
April 20 – Veronica Cartwright, English-born actress
April 23 – Joyce DeWitt, actress, (Three's Company)
April 28 – Paul Guilfoyle, actor, (CSI: Crime Scene Investigation)
May 1 – Douglas Barr, actor, (The Fall Guy)
May 9
Billy Joel, American singer-songwriter
Beverly Penberthy, Actress (Another World)
May 26 – Philip Michael Thomas, actor, (Miami Vice)
June 12 – Roger Aaron Brown, actor, (The District)
June 15 – Jim Varney, actor and comedian (died 2000)
June 16 – Geoff Pierson, actor, (Ryan's Hope, Unhappily Ever After, Dexter)
June 20 – Lionel Richie, singer
June 22 
Lindsay Wagner, actress, (The Bionic Woman)
Rand Morrison, producer
June 25 
Kene Holliday, actor, (Matlock)
Phyllis George, actress, (died 2020)
July 3 – Jan Smithers, actress, (WKRP in Cincinnati)
July 4 – Arnold Díaz, American television consumer watchdog journalist
July 8 – Carmel Cryan, actor
July 10 – Mark Shera, actor, (Barnaby Jones, S.W.A.T.)
July 11 – Jay Johnson, ventriloquist, actor, (Soap)
July 16 – Cyndy Garvey, American television personality
July 24 – Michael Richards, actor, (Seinfeld)
July 27 – Maureen McGovern, actress
August 21 
Loretta Devine, actress and singer, (Boston Public, Grey's Anatomy)
Josephine Abady, American stage director
August 23 
Rick Springfield, Australian singer-songwriter and actor
Shelley Long, actress, (Cheers)
August 24 
Joe Regalbuto, actress, (Murphy Brown)
Patricia Shevlin, producer
August 25 – John Savage, actor, (Dark Angel)
September 10 
Bill O'Reilly, television journalist, host, (The O'Reilly Factor)
Tony Evans, television pastor
September 16 – Ed Begley, Jr., actor, (St. Elsewhere)
September 20 – Anthony Denison, actor
September 23
Floella Benjamin, Trinidad-born British actress, children's TV presenter, (Play School)
Bruce Springsteen, American singer-songwriter
September 25 – Anson Williams, actor and director, (Happy Days)
September 28 – Vernee Watson-Johnson, actress
September 30 – Ann Risley, actress and comedian, (Saturday Night Live)
October 3 – Norm Abram, master carpenter, (This Old House)
October 8 – Sigourney Weaver, actress
October 9 – Shera Danese, actress, (Columbo)
October 14 – Katy Manning, English actress
October 15 – Tanya Roberts, actress, (died 2021)
October 21 – LaTanya Richardson Jackson, actress
October 28 – Sandra Sade, Israeli actress (Sabri Maranan)
November 1 – Belita Moreno, actress, (Perfect Strangers, George Lopez)
November 3 – Mike Evans, actor, (All in the Family, The Jeffersons and creator of Good Times) (died 2006)
November 4 – Berlinda Tolbert, actress, (The Jeffersons)
November 5 – Armin Shimerman, actor, (Star Trek: Deep Space Nine, Buffy the Vampire Slayer)
November 6 – Nigel Havers, English actor
November 11 – Denise Gordy, actress
November 19 – Ahmad Rashad, Sportscaster and former NFL football player
November 23 – Jerry verDorn, soap opera actor (Guiding Light, One Life to Live)
November 24 – Damon Evans, actor, (The Jeffersons)
November 28 – Paul Shaffer, singer
November 29 – Garry Shandling, actor and comedian, (The Larry Sanders Show) (died 2016)
December 2 – Ron Raines, American actor, (Guiding Light)
December 3 – Heather Menzies, Canadian actress, (Logan's Run) (died 2017)
December 4 – Pamela Stephenson, New Zealand actress and comedian
December 5 – Lanny Wadkins, golfer
December 15 – Don Johnson, actor, (Miami Vice, Nash Bridges)
December 19 – Rita Taggart, actress
December 21 – Michael Horse, actor, (Twin Peaks)

References